This is a comprehensive list of victories of the  cycling team. The races are categorized according to the UCI Continental Circuits rules.

2000 – Bonjour 

Stage 3 Tour de Langkawi, Damien Nazon
Stage 5 Paris–Nice, François Simon
Paris–Camembert, Didier Rous
Stage 4 Circuit des Mines, Sébastien Joly
Overall GP du Midi Libre, Didier Rous
Stage 1, Damien Nazon
Grand Prix de Villers-Cotterêts, Damien Nazon
Mi-Août 3, Jean-Cyril Robin
Stage 3 Tour de l'Ain, Frédéric Gabriel
GP Le Télégramme, Walter Bénéteau
Stage 1 Tour du Poitou-Charentes, Damien Nazon
Stage 3 Tour de l'Avenir, Fabrice Salanson
Stage 1 Circuit Franco-Belge, Sylvain Chavanel

2001 – Bonjour 

Stages 3 & 4 Étoile de Bessèges, Damien Nazon
Tour de Vendée, Didier Rous
Trophée des Grimpeurs, Didier Rous
 Overall Four Days of Dunkirk, Didier Rous
Stages 5 & 6a, Didier Rous
Prologue Dauphiné Libéré, Didier Rous
 Road Race Championships, Didier Rous
 Overall Tour du Limousin, Franck Bouyer
Stage 1, Franck Bouyer
Tour du Finistère, Franck Rénier

2002 – Bonjour 

Stage 2 Tour of Qatar, Damien Nazon
Grand Prix de la Ville de Lillers, Pascal Deramé
 Overall Tour de Normandie, Jérôme Pineau
 Overall Circuit de la Sarthe, Didier Rous
Tour de Vendée, Franck Bouyer
Trophée des Grimpeurs, Sylvain Chavanel
 Overall Four Days of Dunkirk, Sylvain Chavanel
Stage 2 GP du Midi Libre, Fabrice Salanson
Stage 2a Tour of Belgium, Damien Nazon
Stage 1 Route du Sud, Damien Nazon
Stage 1 Tour de l'Ain, Damien Nazon
Stage 3 Tour du Poitou-Charentes, Damien Nazon

2003 – Brioches La Boulangère 

Stage 2 Tour of Qatar, Damien Nazon
Stage 2 Tour Méditerranéen, Emmanuel Magnien
Tour du Haut Var, Sylvain Chavanel
Critérium des Espoirs, Anthony Geslin
Grand Prix de la Ville de Lillers, Damien Nazon
Classic Loire Atlantique, Thomas Voeckler
Grand Prix Rudy Dhaenens, Christophe Kern
Stage 1 Critérium International, Damien Nazon
Stage 3b Circuit de la Sarthe, Sylvain Chavanel
Trophée des Grimpeurs, Didier Rous
 Overall Tour de Luxembourg, Thomas Voeckler
Stages 1 & 3a, Thomas Voeckler
 Road Race Championships, Didier Rous
Polynormande, Jérôme Pineau
Stage 1 Tour de l'Ain, Jérôme Pineau
Stage 2 Tour de l'Ain, Maryan Hary
Stage 1 Tour du Limousin, Didier Rous
Boucles de l'Aulne, Walter Bénéteau
Stages 2 & 3 Tour de l'Avenir, Sébastien Chavanel
Stage 8 Tour de l'Avenir, Thomas Voeckler
Stage 2b Tour de la Somme, Jimmy Engoulvent

2004 – Brioches La Boulangère 

Clásica de Almería, Jérôme Pineau
Route Adélie de Vitré, Anthony Geslin
Stage 1 Circuit de la Sarthe, Franck Bouyer
Paris–Camembert, Franck Bouyer
 Overall Four Days of Dunkirk, Sylvain Chavanel
Stage 3, Didier Rous
 Overall Tour of Belgium, Sylvain Chavanel
A Travers le Morbihan, Thomas Voeckler
Stage 4 Route du Sud, Thomas Voeckler
 Road Race Championships, Thomas Voeckler
Tour du Doubs, Mathieu Sprick
Stage 5 Tour de Wallonie, Sébastien Chavanel
Polynormande, Sylvain Chavanel
 Overall Tour de l'Ain, Jérôme Pineau
Stage 1, Jérôme Pineau
Stage 3 Tour du Limousin, Didier Rous
Stage 3 & 4 Tour du Poitou Charentes, Sylvain Chavanel
GP Ouest-France, Didier Rous
Stage 1 Hessen-Rundfahrt, Unai Yus
Stages 2, 4 & 5 Tour de l'Avenir, Sébastien Chavanel
Stage 6 Tour de l'Avenir, Christophe Kern
Paris–Bourges, Jérôme Pineau

2005 – Bouygues Télécom 

GP Cholet, Pierrick Fédrigo
Paris–Camembert, Laurent Brochard
Stage 1 Circuit de la Sarthe, Anthony Ravard
Stage 3 Circuit de Lorraine, Anthony Geslin
 Overall Four Days of Dunkirk, Pierrick Fédrigo
Stage 3, Thomas Voeckler
Stage 6 Volta a Catalunya, Anthony Charteau
Stage 3 Route du Sud, Didier Rous
 Road Race Championships, Pierrick Fédrigo
3rd  Road World Championships, Anthony Geslin

2006 – Bouygues Télécom 

Stage 3 GP Costa Azul, Sébastien Chavanel
Stage 5 Tour of the Basque Country, Thomas Voeckler
Paris–Camembert, Anthony Geslin
Trophée des Grimpeurs, Didier Rous
Stage 4 Four Days of Dunkirk, Pierrick Fédrigo
Stage 1 Tour de Picardie, Rony Martias
 Overall Route du Sud, Thomas Voeckler
Stage 1, Thomas Voeckler
 Netherlands, Time Trial Championships, Stef Clement
Tour du Doubs, Yoann Le Boulanger
Stage 14 Tour de France, Pierrick Fédrigo
Overall Paris–Corrèze, Didier Rous
Stage 1, Didier Rous
Clásica de San Sebastián, Xavier Florencio
Stage 1 Tour du Limousin, Pierrick Fédrigo
Stage 9 Tour de l'Avenir, Stef Clement
Paris–Bourges, Thomas Voeckler
3rd Overall Four Days of Dunkirk, Didier Rous
3rd Stage 10 Vuelta a España, Xavier Florencio

2007 – Bouygues Télécom 

Tro-Bro Léon, Saïd Haddou
Trophée des Grimpeurs, Anthony Geslin
Stage 2 Tour de Luxembourg, Laurent Brochard
Tour du Doubs, Vincent Jérôme
 Road Race Championship, Erki Pütsep
 Time Trial Championship, Stef Clement
Tour du Limousin, Pierrick Fédrigo
 Overall  Tour du Poitou Charentes, Thomas Voeckler
GP Ouest-France, Thomas Voeckler
Stage 1 Circuit Franco-Belge, Aurélien Clerc
3rd, World Championships, Time Trial, Stef Clement

2008 – Bouygues Télécom 

Stage 1 & 4 La Tropicale Amissa Bongo, Rony Martias
 Overall Étoile de Bessèges, Yury Trofimov
Stage 3, Yury Trofimov
Stage 1 Tour de Langkawi, Mathieu Sprick
Stage 1 Driedaagse van West-Vlaanderen, Aurélien Clerc
Overall Tour Ivoirien de la Paix, Rony Martias
Stage 1, Sébastien Turgot
 Overall Circuit de la Sarthe, Thomas Voeckler
Stage 4 Four Days of Dunkirk, Pierrick Fédrigo
Stage 4 Volta a Catalunya, Pierrick Fédrigo
Grand Prix de Plumelec-Morbihan, Thomas Voeckler
Stage 5 Critérium du Dauphiné Libéré, Yury Trofimov
Tour du Doubs, Anthony Geslin
GP Ouest-France, Pierrick Fédrigo
Chrono des Nations, Stef Clement
2nd Gent–Wevelgem, Aurélien Clerc
3rd Paris–Tours, Sébastien Turgot

2009 – Bbox Bouygues Telecom 

Stage 2 La Tropicale Amissa Bongo, Evgeny Sokolov
Stage 4 La Tropicale Amissa Bongo, Johann Tschopp
 Overall Étoile de Bessèges, Thomas Voeckler
Stage 7 Tour de Langkawi, Yohann Gène
 Overall Tour du Haut Var, Thomas Voeckler
Stage 2, Thomas Voeckler
Stage 2 Tour of the Basque Country, Yury Trofimov
Tro-Bro Léon, Saïd Haddou
Trophée des Grimpeurs, Thomas Voeckler
Stage 5 Four Days of Dunkirk, Pierrick Fédrigo
Stage 6 Critérium du Dauphiné Libéré, Pierrick Fédrigo
Stage 5 Tour de France, Thomas Voeckler
Stage 9 Tour de France, Pierrick Fédrigo

2010 – Bbox Bouygues Telecom 

 Overall La Tropicale Amissa Bongo, Anthony Charteau
Stage 4, Anthony Charteau
Stage 5, Yohann Gène
Stage 2 Paris–Nice, William Bonnet
 Overall Critérium International, Pierrick Fédrigo
Stage 1, Pierrick Fédrigo
Stage 1 Three Days of De Panne, Steve Chainel
Stage 2 Three Days of De Panne, Sébastien Turgot
Route Adélie de Vitré, Cyril Gautier
Overall Tour de Bretagne, Franck Bouyer
Stage 4 Circuit de Lorraine, Pierre Rolland
Stage 20 Giro d'Italia, Johann Tschopp
Stage 4 Critérium du Dauphiné, Nicolas Vogondy
 Road Race Championships, Thomas Voeckler
 Time Trial Championships, Nicolas Vogondy
Stage 15 Tour de France, Thomas Voeckler
Stage 16 Tour de France, Pierrick Fédrigo
 Mountains classification in the Tour de France, Anthony Charteau
GP de Québec, Thomas Voeckler

2011 – Team Europcar 

 Overall La Tropicale Amissa Bongo, Anthony Charteau
Stages 2 & 5, Yohann Gène
Stage Étoile de Bessèges, Said Haddou
Stage 1 Tour Méditerranéen, Thomas Voeckler
 Overall Tour du Haut Var, Thomas Voeckler
Stage 3 Tour of South Africa, Yohann Gène
Stages 4 & 8 Paris–Nice, Thomas Voeckler
GP Cholet, Thomas Voeckler
La Roue Tourangelle, David Veilleux
Tro-Bro Léon, Vincent Jérôme
Stage 2 Giro del Trentino, Thomas Voeckler
 Overall Four Days of Dunkirk, Thomas Voeckler
Stage 4, Thomas Voeckler
Stage 2 Circuit de Lorraine, Sébastien Chavanel
Stage 5 Critérium du Dauphiné, Christophe Kern
Prologue Boucles de la Mayenne, Sébastien Turgot
Stage 2 Route du Sud, Anthony Charteau
 Time Trial Championships, Christophe Kern
Stage 19 Tour de France, Pierre Rolland
 Young rider classification in the Tour de France, Pierre Rolland

2012 – Team Europcar 

Stage 3 Étoile de Bessèges, Pierre Rolland
Overall Tour de Normandie, Jérôme Cousin
Stage 2, Jérôme Cousin
Brabantse Pijl, Thomas Voeckler
 Overall La Tropicale Amissa Bongo, Anthony Charteau
Stages 1 & 5, Yohann Gène
Stage 3, Thomas Voeckler
Stage 5 Four Days of Dunkirk, Matteo Pelucchi
Stage 3 Rhône-Alpes Isère Tour, Jérôme Cousin
Stage 4 Rhône-Alpes Isère Tour, Angelo Tulik
Stage 3 Ronde de l'Oise, Matteo Pelucchi
Stages 10 & 16 Tour de France, Thomas Voeckler
Stage 11 Tour de France, Pierre Rolland
 Mountains classification in the Tour de France, Thomas Voeckler
Polynormande, Tony Hurel
Overall Mi-Août Bretonne, David Veilleux
Stage 1, David Veilleux
 Overall Tour du Limousin, Yukiya Arashiro
Tre Valli Varesine, David Veilleux

2013 – Team Europcar 

 Overall La Tropicale Amissa Bongo, Yohann Gène
Stage 6, Yohann Gène
Stages 2 & 4 Étoile de Bessèges, Bryan Coquard
Stage 3 Étoile de Bessèges, Jérôme Cousin
Stages 8 & 9 Tour de Langkawi, Bryan Coquard
Prologue Paris–Nice, Damien Gaudin
Cholet-Pays de Loire, Damien Gaudin
Stage 4 Tour de Normandie, Anthony Charteau
 Overall Circuit de la Sarthe, Pierre Rolland
Stage 4, Pierre Rolland
Tour du Finistère, Cyril Gautier
 Overall Tour of Turkey, Natnael Berhane
Stage 3, Natnael Berhane
Stage 2 Tour de Picardie, Bryan Coquard
Stage 1 Critérium du Dauphiné, David Veilleux
Stage 6 Critérium du Dauphiné, Thomas Voeckler
 Overall Route du Sud, Thomas Voeckler
Stage 2, Yohann Gène
Stage 3, Thomas Voeckler
Overall Boucles de la Mayenne, David Veilleux
 Road Race Championships, Yukiya Arashiro
Stage 4 Tour des Fjords, Angelo Tulik
Châteauroux Classic, Bryan Coquard
 Overall Tour du Poitou-Charentes, Thomas Voeckler
Stage 4 (ITT), Thomas Voeckler

2014 – Team Europcar 

 Overall La Tropicale Amissa Bongo, Natnael Berhane
Stages 3 & 4 Étoile de Bessèges, Bryan Coquard
Route Adélie, Bryan Coquard
Paris–Camembert, Bryan Coquard
La Roue Tourangelle, Angelo Tulik
Stage 5 Four Days of Dunkirk, Jimmy Engoulvent
Stage 1 Tour de Picardie, Bryan Coquard
 Time Trial Championships, Natnael Berhane
Prologue Boucles de la Mayenne, Jimmy Engoulvent
Stage 3 Boucles de la Mayenne, Yohann Gène
Stage 2 Tour du Limousin, Cyril Gautier

2015 – Team Europcar 

 Road Race Championships, Dan Craven
Stage 3 Étoile de Bessèges, Bryan Coquard
Classica Corsica, Thomas Boudat
 Overall Vuelta a Castilla y León, Pierre Rolland
Stage 3, Pierre Rolland
Stage 1 Four Days of Dunkirk, Bryan Coquard
Stage 3 Rhône-Alpes Isère Tour, Fabrice Jeandesboz
Stages 2 & 4 Route du Sud, Bryan Coquard

2016 – Direct Énergie 

 Overall La Tropicale Amissa Bongo, Adrien Petit
Stages 3, 5 & 6 (ITT), Adrien Petit
 Overall Tour La Provence, Thomas Voeckler
Stage 1, Thomas Voeckler
  Overall Tour de Yorkshire, Thomas Voeckler
Stage 3, Thomas Voeckler
 Overall Four Days of Dunkirk, Bryan Coquard
Stages 1, 2 & 3, Bryan Coquard
 Overall Boucles de la Mayenne, Bryan Coquard
Prologue & Stage 2, Bryan Coquard
Stages 1 & 2 Route du Sud, Bryan Coquard
Stage 4 Vuelta a España, Lilian Calmejane

2017 – Direct Énergie 

 Overall Étoile de Bessèges, Lilian Calmejane
Stage 3, Lilian Calmejane
Stage 5 Volta a la Comunitat Valenciana, Bryan Coquard
Stage 4 Vuelta a Andalucía, Bryan Coquard
 Overall La Tropicale Amissa Bongo, Yohann Gène
Stage 2, Tony Hurel
Stage 5, Yohann Gène
Grand Prix de la Ville de Lillers, Thomas Boudat
 Overall Settimana Internazionale di Coppi e Bartali, Lilian Calmejane
Stage 3, Thomas Boudat
Stage 4, Lilian Calmejane
 Overall  Circuit de la Sarthe, Lilian Calmejane
Stages 2a & 4, Bryan Coquard
Stage 3, Lilian Calmejane
Stage 1 Rhône-Alpes Isère Tour, Jérémy Cornu
Stage 4 Four Days of Dunkirk, Sylvain Chavanel
Stage 1 Tour of Belgium, Bryan Coquard
Stage 8 Tour de France, Lilian Calmejane

2018 – Direct Énergie 

Stage 1 Vuelta a Andalucía Ruta Ciclista Del Sol, Thomas Boudat
 Overall Tour du Haut Var, Jonathan Hivert
Stages 1 & 2, Jonathan Hivert
La Drôme Classic, Lilian Calmejane
Stage 3 Paris–Nice, Jonathan Hivert
Stage 5 Paris–Nice, Jérôme Cousin
Paris-Troyes, Adrien Petit
Cholet-Pays de Loire, Thomas Boudat
Paris–Camembert, Lilian Calmejane
Tour du Finistère, Jonathan Hivert
Prologue Tour de Luxembourg, Damien Gaudin
Stage 1 Tour de Wallonie, Romain Cardis

2019 – Direct Énergie 

 Overall La Tropicale Amissa Bongo, Niccolò Bonifazio
Stages 1, 2 & 5, Niccolò Bonifazio
Grand Prix Cycliste la Marseillaise, Anthony Turgis
Classic Sud-Ardèche, Lilian Calmejane
Ronde van Drenthe, Pim Ligthart
GP Miguel Induráin, Jonathan Hivert
Stage 1 Vuelta Ciclista Comunidad de Madrid, Niccolò Bonifazio
Stage 2 Vuelta a Aragón, Jonathan Hivert
Circuit de Wallonie, Thomas Boudat
 National Time Trial Championships, Rein Taaramäe
Stage 1 Tour du Limousin, Lilian Calmejane
Omloop Mandel-Leie-Schelde Meulebeke, Niccolò Bonifazio
Grote Prijs Jef Scherens, Niccolò Bonifazio
Paris-Chauny, Anthony Turgis

2020 – Team Total Direct Energie

Stage 7 La Tropicale Amissa Bongo, Lorrenzo Manzin
Stage 2 Tour of Saudi Arabia, Niccolò Bonifazio
Stage 5 Paris–Nice, Niccolò Bonifazio

2021 – Team Total Direct Energie

Clàssica Comunitat Valenciana 1969, Lorrenzo Manzin
Stage 3 Vuelta Asturias, Pierre Latour
 Overall Tour du Rwanda, Cristián Rodríguez
Stage 4, Valentin Ferron
Stage 8, Cristián Rodríguez
Grote Prijs Jef Scherens, Niccolò Bonifazio

2022 – Team TotalEnergies

Prologue & Stage 5 Tour du Rwanda, Alexandre Geniez
Stage 1 Tour du Rwanda, Sandy Dujardin
Stage 6 Paris–Nice, Mathieu Burgaudeau
Ronde van Drenthe, Dries Van Gestel
Grand Prix du Morbihan, Julien Simon
Tour du Finistère, Julien Simon
Stage 2 Critérium du Dauphiné, Alexis Vuillermoz
Stage 6 Critérium du Dauphiné, Valentin Ferron
Stage 3 Tour de Suisse, Peter Sagan
 National Time Trial Championships, Maciej Bodnar
 National Road Race Championships, Peter Sagan
Stage 1 Tour du Limousin, Julien Simon
Stage 5 Tour Poitou-Charentes en Nouvelle Aquitaine, Lorrenzo Manzin

2023 – Team TotalEnergies

 Overall La Tropicale Amissa Bongo, Geoffrey Soupe
Stage 1, Geoffrey Soupe
Stages 2 & 3, Jason Tesson

Supplementary statistics
Sources

2000 to 2020

2021 to present

Notes

References

Bonjour
wins